The Mari religion (Mari: Чимарий йӱла, Čimarii jüla), also known as Mari paganism, is the ethnic religion of the Mari people, a Volga Finnic ethnic group based in the republic of Mari El, in Russia. The religion has undergone changes over time, particularly under the influence of neighbouring monotheisms. In the last few decades, while keeping its traditional features in the countryside, an organised Neopagan-kind revival has taken place.

The Mari religion is based on the worship of the forces of nature, which man must honour and respect. Before the spread of monotheistic teachings amongst the Mari, they worshipped many gods (the jumo, a word cognate to the Finnish Jumala), while recognising the primacy of a "Great God", Kugu Jumo. In the 19th century, influenced by monotheism, the Pagan beliefs altered and the image of a Osh Kugu Jumo, literally "Great God of Light", was strengthened.

Subject to persecution in the Soviet Union, the faith has been granted official status since the 1990s by the government of Mari El, where it is recognized as one of the three traditional faiths along with Orthodox Christianity and Islam. Some activists claim that the Mari native religion believers are subject to pressure by Russian authorities as part of a wider campaign to Russify Mari culture. Vitaly Tanakov, an adherent of the faith, was charged with inciting religious, national, social and linguistic hatred after publishing the book The Priest Speaks.

Organisation

Followers of the Mari native religion perform public rituals and mass prayers and conduct charitable, cultural and educational activities. They train and educate the younger generation and publish and distribute religious literature. Currently, there are four regional Mari native religion organizations. Prayer meetings and mass prayers are held in accordance with the traditional calendar; it always takes into account the position of the Moon and Sun.

Public prayers are held, usually in the sacred groves (küsoto). Ceremonies are held by a rank of priests. There is a significant discrepancy between the pantheons of the Lowlands Mari, who worship roughly 140 gods, and Highlands Mari, who worship about 70 gods. However most of these deities are different forms of other gods. Nine deities are the most important ones, and these are often said to be hypostases of the high god Osh Kugu Jumo. The Mari native religion includes tree worship and animal sacrifices.

Following
The religion is one of Europe's indigenous religions of unbroken lineage which have survived Christianisation, although it has co-existed with Russian Orthodoxy for generations. Many Mari today are baptized as Christians yet they attend traditional prayers rather than Church services. A sociological survey conducted in 2004 found that about 15 percent of the population of Mari El consider themselves adherents of the Mari native religion. Since Mari make up just 45 percent of the republic's population of 700,000, this figure means that probably more than a third claim to follow the old religion.

The percentage of pagans among the Mari of Bashkortostan and the eastern part of Tatarstan is even higher (up to 69% among women). Mari fled here from forced Christianization in the 17th to 19th centuries.

A similar number was claimed by Victor Schnirelmann, who found that between a quarter and a half of the Mari either worship the Pagan gods or are adherents of Neopagan groups. Mari intellectuals maintain that Mari ethnic believers should be classified in groups with varying degrees of Russian Orthodox influence, including syncretic followers who might even go to church at times, followers of the Mari native religion who are baptized, and nonbaptized Mari.

Gods
Many gods in Mari have counterparts in ancient Hinduism and European religions. Some gods and spirits in the Mari pantheon:

 Kugu Jumo, the main god, often seen as a monistic godhead. Also called Kugurak, the "Elder". He is associated with a duck.
 Tul, god of fire, attribute of Kugu Jumo.
 Surt, spirit of the household, attribute of Kugu Jumo.
 Saksa, god of fertility, attribute of Kugu Jumo.
 Küdryrchö Jumo, god of thunder.
 Tutyra, god of fog, attribute of Kugu Jumo. And other attributes of the godhead.
 Püryshö, the god of fate, the caster and the creator of the future of all men. Cognate with Purusha
 Azyren, the god of death.
 Shüdyr-Shamych, the god of the stars.
 Tylmache, worker of the divine will.
 Tylze, the god of the Moon. Also known as Tõlze.
 Uzhara, the god of the dawn. Cognate with Usha
 Mlande, the god of earth.
 Shochyn-Ava, the goddess of childbirth.
 Tünya, the god of the universe
 Keremet, evil spirit

Many of these gods, especially those controlling natural phenomena, have female counterparts, with the name ending in ava ("mother"), like Tul-Ava, goddess of fire, Mlande-Ava, goddess of earth, Kudurcho-Ava, goddess of thunder, etc.

See also 

 Mari mythology

References

Resources

External links

 Mari Native Religion - Official Website in Russian
 Nikolaus von Twickel. Europe's Last Pagans Worship in Mari-El Grove. Saint Petersburg Times, 2009.
 Mari Paganism: Traditional Religion or Destructive Cult?. Keston News Service, 2002.
 Blog

Uralic modern paganism
Modern paganism in Russia
 
Mari El